Edith Loring Getchell (1855 – 1940) was an American landscape painter and etcher, highly regarded for the "exquisite" tonalism of her etchings, drypoints and watercolors." Working during the "American Etching Revival," a period that lent legitimacy to an art form that had once been scorned as commercial, Getchell made use of the opportunities the vogue for etching gave her, despite a crowded field and the gender discrimination of her era. Considered one of America's leading etchers in her lifetime, Getchell's work is notable for its skill, its aesthetic values and its approach to depicting American landscape.

Career 
Getchell was one of only two women included in a book on America's 25 leading American etchers in 1886. The following year she was invited to exhibit in "'Women Etchers of America,' the earliest comprehensive exposure of the work of women artists by an American institution" — and an historic first. That year, she was also accepted into the nearly all-male New York Etching Club, which her teacher Robert Swain Gifford had helped found. "One of the preeminent groups for the nineteenth-century etching revival," it helped her create key connections for building a viable career.

Over the next several years, Getchell's work was frequently reproduced in print, widely acquired by American art museums and exhibited in London, Paris and across the United States. In 1908, the Worcester Art Museum curated a two-week solo exhibition of her etchings. 

Atlanta's High Museum of Art organized an exhibition revisiting the "American Women of the Etching Revival" in 1988. Curator Phyllis Peet cited a 1902 review to describe her:[T]he work of Edith Loring Getchell is vigorous, original and effective without affectation. . . . Her hand is particularly sympathetic to all that is beautiful in foliation and growth of trees, atmospheric or climatic conditions of light, and those subtleties of nature best adapted to expression with the point. ’  — Will Jenkins, Modern Etching and Engraving in America.

Education 
Getchell studied painting, printmaking and textile design at the Philadelphia School of Design for Women, one of the "art schools [that] conferred professional status in a cultural field once dominated by men... to counter the accusation of amateurism. One of her teachers there was tonalist William Sartain. Another was Peter Moran, best known for his etchings of animal subjects, and for brothers Thomas and Edward who were also professional artists. 

At the Philadelphia Academy of Fine Arts (PAFA), Getchell studied with landscape painter Robert Swain Gifford who was influenced by the more realist, and less romantic, approach to painting of the Barbizon school. At PAFA, she also studied with realist Thomas Eakins, who would later paint a well-received portrait of Getchell's husband  As a private student, Getchell also studied with landscape painter and etcher Stephen Parrish, with whom she later exhibited alongside artist Mary Cassatt.

Memberships 
 California Society of Etchers
 Chicago Society of Etchers
 New York Etching Club
 Philadelphia Sketch Club
 Philadelphia Society of Artists

Collections
Library of Congress
New York Public Library
Boston Museum of Fine Arts
Five Colleges of Ohio
National Gallery of Art, Washington
Princeton University Art Museum
Smithsonian American Art Museum
University of Arizona Museum of Art
Wentworth Military Academy Museum
Worcester Art Museum
University Art Collection, Georgetown
The Walters Art Museum, Baltimore
Wellin Museum of Art, Hamilton College
 Museum of Art, University of New Hampshire

Publications 

 American etchings: A collection of twenty original etchings by Moran, Parrish, Ferris, Smillie, and others ; with descriptive text and biographical matter. Boston: Estes and Lauriat: January 1, 1885 ASIN : ‎ B00086AUHE 
 Gems of American Etchers. New York: Cassell, c1885. (Sirsi) ACO-0770 62653
 Union League Club, Exhibition Catalogue of the Work of Women Etchers of America. New York: Frederick Keppel & Company
 Philadelphia Art Union. New York: Frederick Keppel & Company.

Commissions 

 Philadelphia: Robert M. Lindsay 
 San Francisco: W.K. Vickery 
 Union League Club: Cover of the "Women Etchers of America" exhibition catalogue

Gallery

See also 

 Etching
 Etching revival

References 

1855 births
1940 deaths
19th-century American women artists
20th-century American women artists
19th-century engravers
Women engravers
Landscape artists
American women painters
Women painters
Philadelphia School of Design for Women alumni
People associated with the Worcester Art Museum